Waterloo Road Hill or Black Rock Hill is a hill near Ho Man Tin in Hong Kong. It is a quiet residential district. It is named from Waterloo Road, which is a major road in Kowloon.

History
On 24 August 1967, Lam Bun was on his way to work, men posing as road maintenance workers stopped his vehicle and blocked his car doors and doused Lam and his cousin with petrol.

Education
New Method College
Yu Chun Keung Memorial College

References

Mountains, peaks and hills of Hong Kong